Veteranz Day is the seventh and most-recent studio album by emcee Big Daddy Kane, released on April 28, 1998. The album came four years after his previous effort, 1994's Daddy's Home. Veteranz Day received little attention, commercially and critically, and was met with mixed reviews and little sales. It was his first and only album not to chart on the Billboard 200. Veteranz' Day was the first and only album release for the small New York-based record label called the Label Records, which was founded by Frank Yandolino. Although it managed to earn a distribution deal with Mercury Records by way of Joan Jett's and Kenny Laguna's Blackheart Records, which was acting as a boutique distribution outlet for independent labels from 1998 to 2000, The Label folded almost shortly after the release of Veteranz Day. The album features the single "Uncut, Pure," which reached the top 10 on the Hot Rap Singles chart.  There are two versions of "Uncut, Pure"—the original version produced by Easy Mo Bee, and a sequel version produced by Big Daddy Kane himself, the latter of which was released on the independently released 12-inch single and also featured as a bonus track on the CD and cassette versions of the album.

Track listing

Charts

Singles

References

Big Daddy Kane albums
1998 albums
Blackheart Records albums
Albums produced by Big Daddy Kane
Albums produced by Easy Mo Bee